Cluck-U Chicken, also known as Cluck University, is an American quick-serve restaurant chain, with most locations in the U.S. states of Maryland and New Jersey, but there are locations in Pennsylvania as well as one location in Ohio and one international location in Lebanon, Kuwait, and the UAE. There were previously several other locations, including Delaware, Florida, Chapel Hill NC, and Washington, D.C. as well as a location in Fort Collins, CO.

While most locations are franchises, Cluck-U also operates corporate-owned stores, featuring a more limited menu, under the name Cluckster's.

History
Cluck-U Chicken was started by Robert Ilvento in 1985.  The first location was in New Brunswick, New Jersey at Rutgers University. Ilvento sold the business in 1999.

In 2000, JP Haddad acquired the rights to develop the franchise nationally, while Ilvento began to promote the business.

Products
Cluck-U Chicken (a.k.a. "Cluck") serves chicken wings ("wingers") with a variety of traditional sauces including Honey-Hickory and spicy sauces on the scale Mild, Atomic, Nuclear, Thermo-Nuclear, 911 and Nuclear Fusion. At some locations where the "911" sauce is served, customers must sign a liability waiver. Other food products include chicken sandwiches, salads, appetizers, chicken fingers, fries, rice bowls, fish sandwiches and the like.

See also
 List of fast-food chicken restaurants

References

External links
Official website

Economy of the Northeastern United States
Regional restaurant chains in the United States
Fast-food chains of the United States
Fast-food poultry restaurants
1985 establishments in New Jersey
Restaurants established in 1985

Chicken chains of the United States
American companies established in 1985